Hemibrycon sanjuanensis is a species of characin from the upper San Juan River, Colombia.

Etymology
It takes its name from the San Juan River, where specimens were collected.

Description
The body is slender and long, with a short, compressed face and flexible lips. In an example of sexual dimorphism, the rays of males' pelvic and anal fins are lined with small hooks.

General coloration is a dark brownish-yellow, with a dark stripe running from directly behind the gills to the caudal peduncle.  The ventral surface is light yellow.  The dorsum and fins are patterned with melanophores.  A reddish spot can be observed on the ventral part of the base of the caudal fin.

Range and habitat
H. sanjuanensis is believed to be endemic to the upper San Juan River in Colombia.  Specimens were recovered from clear, fast-flowing streams with sandy or rocky bottoms.

Diet
The species is insectivorous.  Among other things, it has been known to eat water scavenger beetles, black flies, flesh flies, damselflies, predaceous diving beetles, caddisflies, nematodes, and isopods.

References

Characidae
Freshwater fish of Colombia
Fish described in 2014